Vawter is a surname. Notable people with the surname include:

Bransford Vawter (1815–1838), American poet
Bruce Vawter (1921–1986), American Roman Catholic priest and biblical scholar
Homer Vawter (1894–1958), American politician
John Terrell Vawter (1830–1916), American businessman-banker
Ron Vawter (1948–1994), American actor 
Vince Vawter, American novelist
Will Vawter (1871–1941), American artist